Cernach may refer to:

Conall Cernach
Saint Cernach